Guru Jambheshwar University of Science and Technology, Hisar, was founded in 1995. The jurisdiction of the university extends to the courses being run in the areas of science, technology, engineering, pharmacy and management.

Guru Jambheshwar University of Science and Technology, Hisar, was established on 20 October 1995 by an Act of the Legislature of the State of Haryana. It was formally inaugurated on 1 November 1995. It is named after Guru Jambheshwar Ji Maharaj, a saint environmentalist of the 15th century.

Campus

The GJU is located about 1 km from the Hisar Airport; 2 km from the Blue Bird Lake; 3 km from the bus station along the National Highway 9 (old NH10), 4 km from the town center & main market area; 6 km from the Hisar Junction railway station; 6 km from Mahabir Stadium; 167 km from the Indira Gandhi International Airport, Delhi; 180 km from the New Delhi railway station; and 235 km from the Chandigarh International Airport.

The university is situated over about 372 acres.

The university has eight teaching blocks. There are 149 residential houses for employees.The university has the branch of Punjab National Bank with ATM, a post office and a police station. The university is running its own cafeteria.

Academic

Academic programmes
The university offers a wide range of academic programmes and courses at post-graduate and undergraduate level.  All these courses are designed by taking into consideration the special needs of the market and the Industry and the Model Curricula supplied by the UGC/AICTE. Emphasis is laid on both theoretical and practical training for exposing students to the latest developments in areas of science and technology.  For the purpose, the university invites academicians, professionals and researchers from institutions and industries.  Adequate training and placement facilities are available for the students. The university arranges campus interviews. Workshops, seminars and symposia are conducted regularly. In-plant industrial training is an essential component of most of the courses.

Recognition and accreditation

The university is recognised by the University Grants Commission.

Credit-based systems of examinations
The university switched to a credit-based system for all courses in 2006-07. The prominent features of the credit-based system are the process of continuous evaluation of a student's performance and flexibility to allow the students to progress at an optimum pace suited to individual ability and convenience, subject to fulfilling minimum requirement for continuation.

Rankings

GJUS&T was ranked in the 101-150 band overall in India by National Institutional Ranking Framework (NIRF) in 2021, 88th among universities and 27 in the pharmacy ranking.

Notable alumni
 Dushyant Chautala, Deputy Chief Minister of Haryana
 Rohit Sardana, India Journalist

See also
 State University of Performing And Visual Arts
 State Institute of Film and Television

References

External links

Research institutes in Hisar (city)
Guru Jambheshwar University of Science and Technology
Engineering colleges in Haryana
Universities and colleges in Hisar (city)
Research institutes established in 1995
1995 establishments in Haryana